The International Committee of History of Science was founded in 1928 at the 6th Congress of the Historical Sciences, Oslo. The committee then organised the First International Congress of History of Science, which they held in Paris in 1929. They held the Second International Congress of the History of Science in London in 1931, where they transformed themselves into the International Academy of the History of Science, which was based on individual membership.

References

History of science organizations
International scientific organizations
1928 establishments in Norway